MEPS may refer to:

 Malaysian Electronic Payment System, a regional interbank network system in Malaysia
 Mañana Es Para Siempre (Tomorrow Is Forever), Mexican telenovela
 Marine Ecology Progress Series, a scientific journal dealing mostly with research in the field of marine ecology
 MAS Electronic Payment System, an interbank network in Singapore
 Medical Expenditure Panel Survey
 Microextraction by Packed Sorbent
 United States Military Entrance Processing Station
 Minimum Energy Performance Standard

See also
 MEP (disambiguation) for singular, when "MEPS" is treated as the plural form